Proctor is a census-designated place (CDP) in Adair County, Oklahoma, United States. The population was 231 at the 2010 census.

Geography
U.S. Route 62 runs through the center of the community, leading east  to Westville and west  to Tahlequah.

Demographics

References

Census-designated places in Adair County, Oklahoma
Census-designated places in Oklahoma